Jake Rashaan Reed (born March 11, 1996) is an American football safety who is a free agent. He played college football at Georgia.

Early years
Reed attended Prestonwood Christian Academy in Plano, Texas. He played safety and wide receiver. He committed to the University of Tulsa to play college football.

College career
Reed played one year at Tulsa in 2015. In 2016, he transferred to the University of Georgia. After not playing his first year due to transfer rules, Reed started all 15 games in 2017. He recorded 79 tackles, two interceptions and 1.5 sacks. In 2018, he started all 14 games, totaling 66 tackles, two interceptions and one sack. Reed returned to Georgia for his senior season, rather than enter the 2019 NFL Draft. He was named a finalist for the Jim Thorpe Award and Bronko Nagurski Trophy.

Statistics

Professional career

Jacksonville Jaguars
Reed signed with the Jacksonville Jaguars as an undrafted free agent on April 27, 2020. He was waived on September 5, 2020.

Los Angeles Rams
On September 9, 2020, Reed was signed to the Los Angeles Rams practice squad. He was elevated to the active roster on November 23 and November 28 for the team's weeks 11 and 12 games against the Tampa Bay Buccaneers and San Francisco 49ers, and reverted to the practice squad after each game. On December 5, 2020, Reed was promoted to the active roster.

On October 2, 2021, Reed was waived by the Rams and re-signed to the practice squad.

New York Giants
On October 26, 2021, Reed was signed by the New York Giants off the Rams practice squad.

Denver Broncos
On March 21, 2022, Reed signed with the Denver Broncos. He was waived on August 30, 2022.

Las Vegas Raiders
On September 1, 2022, Reed was signed to the Las Vegas Raiders practice squad. He was released on September 27.

Detroit Lions
On October 25, 2022, Reed was signed to the Detroit Lions practice squad. He was released off the practice squad three days later.

NFL career statistics

Personal life
His father, Jake Reed, played in the NFL with the Minnesota Vikings and the New Orleans Saints. Reed is the nephew of former NFL cornerback Dale Carter, and the first cousin of Nigel Warrior, Dale Carter's son.

References

External links
Georgia Bulldogs bio
Tulsa Hurricane bio

1996 births
Living people
People from Frisco, Texas
Players of American football from Texas
Sportspeople from the Dallas–Fort Worth metroplex
American football safeties
Tulsa Golden Hurricane football players
Georgia Bulldogs football players
All-American college football players
Jacksonville Jaguars players
Los Angeles Rams players
New York Giants players
Denver Broncos players
Las Vegas Raiders players
Detroit Lions players